Lumley may refer to:

People
Surname:
 Aldred Lumley, 10th Earl of Scarbrough
 Benjamin Lumley, theatre manager
 Brian Lumley, writer
 Charles Lumley, soldier
 Ed Lumley,  a corporate executive and former Canadian politician
 Edward Lumley, Canadian politician
 Harry Lumley (baseball) (1880–1938)
 Harry Lumley (ice hockey)
 James Rutherford Lumley (1773–1846), Bengal Army major-general 
 Jane Lumley, wife of John Lumley, 1st Baron Lumley
 Joanna Lumley, British actress
 John Lumley, 1st Baron Lumley
 John L. Lumley, American Professor of Mechanical Engineering 
 Judith M. Lumley, Australian perinatal epidemiologist
 Lawrence Lumley, 11th Earl of Scarbrough
 Marmaduke Lumley, bishop
 Richard Lumley, 1st Earl of Scarbrough
 Richard Lumley, 2nd Earl of Scarbrough
 Robin Lumley, a British jazz-fusion musician
 Viscount Lumley, Earl of Scarbrough

Given name:
 Lumley Franklin, 2nd Mayor of Victoria, BC

Companies
 Lumley Insurance, a division of Insurance Australia Group

Places
 Great Lumley, a village in County Durham, England
 Lumley Castle, a 14th-century quadrangular castle near Chester-le-Street, County Durham
 Lumley Thicks, a small village in County Durham